JJ Waller is a British photographer, best known for his street photographs of Brighton, his home town, and other seaside towns, including Blackpool and Benidorm. His portraits of Brighton people during the 2020 COVID-19 Lockdown featured in The Guardian, in the BBC4 Lockdown drama Unprecedented and in a 2020 book, JJ Waller's Lockdown, edited by Martin Parr.

Performer
Waller grew up in Stoke Newington and Brighton. After leaving school, he trained as a drama teacher and then worked on a community arts project in Liverpool. While in the city he developed a comedy act which he would perform at street parties and events and then developed it to become a street entertainer, at first in London's Covent Garden. Billed as "Captain JJ Waller Unusualist".

The University of Kent's British Comedy Archive includes a JJ Waller Collection, where a flyer describes his act as including "Eating a Live Human Being" and an escapology routine, in which "suspended from the ceiling in a straight jacket singing "My Way" JJ escapes from the jacket and jumps head first into an egg without breaking the yolk." 
 The collection also has a photograph of another act, "'The Bed of Nails' where JJ balanced two London double-decker buses whilst lying on a bed of nails."

Waller spent most of the 1980s working as an act in comedy clubs. He then joined the French circus Archaos, as front-of-house manager, until the company's tent was destroyed by a gale in Dublin in 1991.

Photography
In the 1990s, Waller reinvented himself as a photographer. After taking an evening class in photography, his tutor, Mark Power, suggested that Waller study for a degree in editorial photography at the University of Brighton.  After finishing his degree, Waller spent twelve months as Artist in Residence at Gatwick Airport.  He then toured the world as assistant to Magnum photographer Paul Lowe. Waller subsequently spent a number of years as a photography producer in the advertising industry.

JJ Waller's Brighton
In 2014, Waller published his first book, JJ Waller's Brighton Volume 1.

St Leonards on Sea
In 2007, Waller began to document St Leonards on Sea. Looking back in 2022, he told the Hastings Online Times, "Arriving here was like stumbling across a photographer’s treasure trove. I found a flaking-plaster, super-lager-soaked town that awoke in me undertones of my days exploring the dowdy but exciting streets of nineteen eighties London."

Apart from his 2014 book, JJ Waller's St. Leonards-on-Sea & Hastings Vol 1, his St Leonards work was produced as wallpaper in a collaboration with artist Deborah Bowness. This work can be seen on permanent exhibition at The Saint Leonard. The Bohemians a series of portraits of people living and working in the area of St Leonards named Bohemia, was exhibited as an installation at the Bohemia club in 2016.

In 2022, Waller published JJ Waller's St. Leonards-on-Sea & Hastings Vol 2.

Whitehawk
In 2014, Waller was commissioned to document Whitehawk Football Club, when they played their first season in the Conference South.

Blackpool and Benidorm
In 2017, Waller made several trips to Blackpool, which resulted in JJ Waller;'s Blackpool Volume 1. Waller told Lancashire Life that following a commission to spend a week taking photographs in Blackpool, he fell in love with the place.

After photographing Blackpool, Waller decided to photograph the British abroad, in Benidorm in Spain.

Brighton and Hove Albion
JJ Waller's Brighton & Hove Albion, 2017, documented the history of the football club.

Sussex Bonfires
In November 2018, Waller documented Bonfire Night across Sussex. Rather than photographing the celebration itself, he made before and after images of the bonfires.

JJ Waller's Brighton Pride
Waller regularly photographed his city's Pride festival, which featured in all his Brighton books. In 2018, he decided to publish a separate book on the festival, inspired by that year's Britney Spears concert.

JJ Waller's Lockdown
From March until May 2020, Waller made around 100 informal portraits of people isolated in their homes during the Covid Lockdown. The photographs, taken in Brighton and Hove, St Leonards, Hastings and Firle were almost all shot through windows. His subjects included "a woman holding her newborn baby against the pane of her door, a crouching couple peering out from the front of their house, and an entire family posing in the colours of a local non-league football team."

Martin Parr edited a book, JJ Waller's Lockdown: Informal Portraits of this Time, published in September 2020.  Parr wrote, "When we look back at the spring and summer of 2020, I think this suit of images will be an iconic memory of this strange time we have all lived through."

In 2021, Waller began a second project, in which he asked volunteers to stage scenes, revealing their lockdown activities.

JJ Waller's Sussex by the Sea
Waller spent the summer of 2020 taking photographs of the Sussex coast, from Camber Sands in the east to the Witterings in the west. In November, he published a book of his photographs, which were presented as postcards with captions such as "Play Golf in Sussex", "Cows of Cuckmere" and "Singles Sussex", inspired by the postcards of John Hinde.

Publications
JJ Waller's Brighton. Vol 1. Brighton: Self-published, 2012.
JJ Waller's Brighton. Vol 2. Brighton: Self-published, 2014.
JJ Waller's St. Leonards-on-Sea & Hastings Vol 1. Brighton: Self-published, 2014.
JJ Waller's Blackpool Vol 1. Brighton: Self-published, 2017.
JJ Waller's Brighton & Hove Albion. Brighton: Self-published, 2017.
JJ Waller's Brighton Pride. Brighton: Self-published, 2019.
JJ Waller's Lockdown-Informal Portraits Of This Time. Brighton: Self-published, 2020.
JJ Waller's Sussex By The Sea. Brighton: Self-published, 2020.
JJ Waller's St. Leonards-on-Sea & Hastings Vol 2. Brighton: Self-published, 2022.

References

External links

Year of birth missing (living people)
Living people
Street photographers
People from Brighton and Hove
English buskers
20th-century English comedians